The Richleighs of Tantamount is a children's historical novel written by British author Barbara Willard. It was originally published in the United Kingdom in 1966 by the publishers, Constable, before being published in the United States by Harcourt, Brace & World in June 1967. C. Walter Hodges drew the line illustrations and painted the cover portrait for the original edition.

Chapters
To Be a Richleigh...
Toy Sunday
The Travellers
The Arrival
Tantamount
Strangers on the Shore
The Castaways
Nancy and Dick
The Wonderful Day
Wreckers' Castle
The Grand Idea
Pursuit
Home from the Sea
An End...
...or a Beginning

Synopsis
The book tells the story of four young siblings—Edwin, Angeline, Sebastian and Maud—who live together in a London mansion in Victorian society (c. the 1870s), along with their wealthy parents. These four children have been longing all their lives for their maiden visit to Tantamount, a castle on the Cornish coast, built by their great-great-great-grandfather. From time to time, the children wonder about its mysterious past as they look at the gigantic painting of the castle that dominates a wall in their drawing room.

Their lives are changed one fateful, unforgettable July when their father contracts a serious illness. The children are sent to stay at the castle while their parents go on a sea voyage to repair his health. Only when the children begin to explore do they realize that despite being built and furnished in magnificent style, the castle is suffering from decades of neglect. The tutor and governess are shocked by the condition of the place and leave abruptly. Soon the recently engaged servants do the same, but the children decide to stay on alone.

Regarding themselves as castaways, they enjoy their freedom despite the hardships. They make friends with two local children, Nancy and Dick, and are worried when they disappear. They begin to suspect that the castle is being used for smuggling and even wrecking. Tantamount is destroyed by fire, but when the parents arrive at last they are relieved to find their children have survived.

Characters

The Richleigh four
Edwin Richleigh, 16: the eldest and most educated of the siblings, and heir to the family's fortune.
Angeline Richleigh, 14: rebellious but innocent in appearance.
Sebastian Richleigh, 11: the big question-asker who always remembers the answers better than his older brother.
Maud Richleigh, 8: treated by everyone except older Angeline as the baby of the family; she is the prettiest among the four.

Their parents
Major Sir Rautboy Richleigh (pronounced Raw-bee), England's third-richest man.
Lady Daisy, his wife, heiress and earl's daughter.

Inside the London house
Mr. Gaunt, Edwin's English tutor.
Miss Venus, the governess; teacher of Angeline, Sebastian and Maud.
Old Nurse and New Nurse, the caretakers responsible for the house's upkeep. They both make their first appearances when the book begins.
Lance, the pageboy, “ready to answer the door if need be”. He also appears at the start of the book.

Mentioned by the family
Lady Augusta, Queen Victoria's cousin, who lives across the square near which the Richleighs live.
Uncle Charles, Sir Rautboy's stern, serious, long-faced brother, whom the four children all dread.

At Tantamount and vicinity
Mr. Devine, an agent from Exeter who takes to the castle's upkeep and reports on its conditions annually.
Mrs. Pengelly, a visitor from England's southern region who assists in helping the four children and company upon their arrival at Tantamount.
(Mr.) Pengelly, her husband.
Betsy Pengelly, the Pengellys' daughter.
Nancy Treloar and her brother Dick Treloar, two local children whom the Richleighs discover during the first day of their visit.
Kate Treloar, their aunt, who lives miles away from Tantamount at a place called Penwellow.
Mr. John Pascoe, a kind man who owns a farm called Treligger.
Mrs. Pascoe, his sour and unjust wife.
William Treloar, Nancy and Dick's father.

Customs
Wif, short for What would you do if—?, the Richleigh children's favourite game.
Toy Sunday, a toy-distribution spree occurring twice yearly; only one of them, the last Sunday in May, is mentioned in the book.
Councils of Tantamount: Edwin holds meetings for three of them at various times during the siblings' visit to the ruined castle.

1966 British novels
Children's historical novels
Novels set in Cornwall
British children's novels
Constable & Co. books
Fiction set in the 1870s
1966 children's books